Vandalia is an unincorporated community in Lewis County, in the U.S. state of West Virginia.

History
A post office called Vandalia was established in 1890, and remained in operation until 1907. The community derives its name from the Vandals, according to local history.

References

Unincorporated communities in Lewis County, West Virginia
Unincorporated communities in West Virginia